Kuligino is a rural locality (a village) in Dobryansky District, Perm Krai, Russia. The population was 63 as of 2010. There are 3 streets.

Geography 
Kuligino is located 47 km south of Dobryanka (the district's administrative centre) by road. Zalesnaya is the nearest rural locality.

References 

Rural localities in Dobryansky District